KVV may refer to:

 Swedish Prison and Probation Service, also known as Kriminalvården
 , the public transport association for Karlsruhr, Germany
 Koninklijke Voetbal Vereniging (disambiguation)